The Saky City Municipality (translit. Saks'ka mis'krada) is one of the 25 regions of the Crimean Peninsula, internationally recognized as part of Ukraine, but currently occupied by Russia. The region is located on the western coast of Crimea on the Black Sea's shore. Its administrative centre is the city of Saky. In 2014, the population stood at 25,146.

Unlike in the other regions and municipalities of Crimea which contain a number of other settlements under its jurisdiction, the Saky municipality only consists of its administrative center Saky.

Name
Colloquially, the municipality is known as "the territory governed by the Saky City Council".

Administrative divisions
Within the framework of administrative divisions of Russia, Saky is, together with a number of rural localities, incorporated separately as the "town of republican significance of Saki"—an administrative unit with the status equal to that of the districts. As a municipal division, the town of republican significance of Saki is incorporated as "Saki Urban Okrug".

Within the framework of administrative divisions of Ukraine, Saky is incorporated as the "town of republican significance of Saky". Ukraine does not have municipal divisions.

Government
The Saky City Council's members are elected every four years, with 21 councillors elected in single-mandate districts, and 21 councillors in a multiple mandate district.

Demographics
The Saky municipality's population was 28,522 as of the 2001 Ukrainian Census and 25,146 in 2014 according to the 2014 Crimean Census.

The region's nationality composition in the 2001 census was: 
 Russians – 65.1 percent
 Ukrainians – 24.3 percent
 Crimean Tatars – 5.8 percent
 All other nationalities – 4.8 percent.

References

External links
 

 
Municipalities of Crimea